The 1928 Georgia Normal Blue Tide football team represented Georgia Normal School—now known as Georgia Southern University—during the 1928 college football season. The team's head was coached was Hugh A. Woodle, in his second and final year.

Schedule

References

Georgia Normal
Georgia Southern Eagles football seasons
Georgia Normal Blue Tide football